Hunters is an album by American art rock band The Residents. Released in 1995, it is a soundtrack album commissioned for the Discovery Channel series Hunters: The World of Predators and Prey. The entire album is ten hours long, the largest soundtrack project that The Residents had attempted. The series with the music first aired in December of 1994 and the soundtrack CD was released early in 1995.

Track listing
 "Hunters Prelude"
 "The Deadly Game"
 "Tooth and Claw"
 "The Dangerous Sea"
 "Rulers of the Deep"
 "Track of the Cat"
 "The Giant Grizzlies"
 "Dawn of the Dragons"
 "Eye of the Serpent"
 "The Crawling Kingdom"
 "The Savage Pack"
 "Hunters Reprise"

Credits 

 Manufactured By – BMG Music
 Copyright © – Milan Entertainment, Inc.
 Produced At – The Magic Shop
 Mastered At – Master Cutting Room
 Phonographic Copyright ℗ – Telenova Productions, Inc.
 Manufactured By – HMG (2)
 Distributed By – BMG Music
 Copyright © – Telenova Productions, Inc.
 Edited At – The Magic Shop

 Art Direction [Album] – Judy Kaganowich
 Edited By [Digital Editing] – Oliver Straus
 Executive-Producer [Album] – Robert Fish
 Executive-Producer [Executive In Charge Of Production] – Clark Bunting
 Executive-Producer [For Telenova] – Barry Clark (6), Terry Tanner
 Executive-Producer [For The Discovery Channel] – Angus Yates, Steve Burns (13)
 Executive-Producer [Milan] – Emmanuel Chamboredon, Toby Pieniek
 Mastered By – Joe Brescio
 Producer [Album], Edited By [Album] – Steve Rosenthal
 Supervised By [Package Supervision] – Chris Maguire
 Written-By, Performer, Producer [Music] – The Residents

References

Television soundtracks
The Residents soundtracks
1995 soundtrack albums